Dronyayevo, may refer to:

Dronyayevo, Kursky District, Kursk Oblast, a village in Kursk Oblast, Russia
Dronyayevo, Kurchatovsky District, Kursk Oblast, a village (selo) in Kursk Oblast, Russia